Mario Wilfredo Contreras (born May 22, 1987 in Santa Ana) is a Salvadoran road racing cyclist. He represented El Salvador at the 2008 Summer Olympics in Beijing, where he competed for the men's road race. Contreras, however, did not finish the run, before reaching the 174.0 km lap of the course.

Career achievements

2007
2nd Stage 2 Vuelta Ciclista a Talavera, Juniors, Casar Talavera (ESP) 
2009
1st National Championship, Road, ITT, Elite, El Salvador (ESA) 
5th General Classification Vuelta a Nicaragua (NIC)
2010
1st National Championship, Road, ITT, Elite, El Salvador, Cd. Arce (ESA) 
3rd National Championship, Road, Elite, El Salvador, Olocuilta (ESA)

References

External links

NBC 2008 Olympics profile

1987 births
Living people
Salvadoran male cyclists
Cyclists at the 2008 Summer Olympics
Olympic cyclists of El Salvador
Sportspeople from Santa Ana, El Salvador